Erik Augustin Lincar (born 16 October 1978 in Oradea) is a Romanian football manager and former player.

He was born in Oradea and debuted in Divizia A with Steaua București in 1997, having joined Steaua from the Girondins de Bordeaux youth team. Steaua won the league title during his first season with the club, took the cup title in 1999 and the league title again in 2001. In 2002, he headed overseas to spend two unsuccessful seasons in Greece at Panathinaikos and Akratitos. After playing for a while in Russia for FC Amkar Perm, Lincar returns to Romania. He played for Prefab Modelu where he is also an assistant manager. In 2011, he was manager of FC Hunedoara for six matches being dismissed on 26 September 2011.

International career

Lincar got 5 caps for the Romania national team in 1999 and 2000, and was an unused substitute at Euro 2000.

International stats

Honours

Player
CSA Steaua București
Divizia A: 1997–98, 2000–01
Romanian Cup: 1998–99
Romanian Super Cup: 1998, 2001

Manager
Callatis Mangalia
Liga III: 2010–11

Damila Măciuca
Liga III: 2011–12

Turris Turnu Măgurele
Liga III: 2018–19

References

External links
 
 
 Erik Lincar at fcprefab.ro
 
 

1978 births
Living people
Sportspeople from Oradea
Romanian footballers
Association football midfielders
FC Steaua București players
Panathinaikos F.C. players
A.P.O. Akratitos Ano Liosia players
FC Amkar Perm players
FC Progresul București players
CS Concordia Chiajna players
Liga I players
Super League Greece players
Russian Premier League players
Romanian expatriate footballers
Expatriate footballers in Greece
Expatriate footballers in Russia
Romania under-21 international footballers
Romania international footballers
UEFA Euro 2000 players
Romanian football managers
CS Corvinul Hunedoara managers
CS Sportul Snagov managers
CS Universitatea Craiova managers
LPS HD Clinceni managers
CS Luceafărul Oradea managers
AFC Turris-Oltul Turnu Măgurele managers
CS Concordia Chiajna managers
FC Universitatea Cluj managers
Liga I managers
Liga II managers